The Sousa River is a river in Portugal, a tributary of the Douro. It rises in the parish of Friande, Felgueiras, in the Porto District of northwest Portugal, and is a right tributary of the Douro, which it meets at the parish of Foz do Sousa, Gondomar, about 16 km from the mouth of the Douro.

Etymology
The name is from Latin Saxa 'rocks', later called Sausa.

Tributaries

 Ferreira River
 Cavalum River
 Messio River

Tributaries of the Douro River
Rivers of Portugal